The gold-fronted riverdamsel (Pseudagrion aureofrons) is a damselfly species in the family Coenagrionidae.
Its body length is 36 millimeters. They are also known as gold-fronted sprites. Gold-fronted riverdamsels can be found near running or still water. They usually fly close to the surface of water, sometimes resting on floating material. They may not be as abundant as their relative the blue riverdamsel, but they are easily recognized by their golden-yellow faces and thorax. Its status is fairly common. They can be found cruising above the water on sunny days along slow-flowing sections of creeks.

Distribution 
This damselfly species can be found in the Australian States of Australian Capital Territory, New South Wales, Northern Territory, Queensland, South Australia, Victoria, Western Australia.

Gallery

References 

 Brisbane Insects: Dragonflies and Damselflies - Order Odonata

Coenagrionidae
Insects of Australia
Insects described in 1906